Élodie is a French feminine  given name, a variant of Alodia, possibly a Gothic name with elements Ala "other, foreign"(?) and od "wealth, heritage".
The given name was popularized via veneration of Saint Alodia, a 9th-century child martyr.

People 
 Élodie Bouchez (born 1973), French actress
 Élodie Brouiller (born 1987), French former competitive ice dancer
 Elodie Di Patrizi (born 1990), Italian singer also known simply as Elodie
 Élodie Frégé, French singer
 Élodie Frenck (born 1974), Peruvian-Swiss-French actress 
 Élodie Gagnon, Canadian radio personality
 Elodie Ghedin (born 1967), Canadian parasitologist and virologist
 Élodie Gossuin (born 1980), French politician and beauty pageant contestant, Miss France 2001 and Miss Europe 2001
 Élodie Guégan (born 1985), French middle-distance runner
 Élodie Jacquier-Laforge (born 1978), French politician
 Elodie Keene (born 1949), American television director
 Elodie Kuijper (born 2000), Dutch racing cyclist
 Elodie Lauten (1950–2014), French-born American composer
 Élodie La Villette (1848–1917), French painter
 Elodie Lawton (1825–1908), British writer and abolitionist
 Élodie Mailloux (1865–1937), Canadian nun and nursing school founding director
 Élodie Navarre (born 1979), French actress
 Élodie Ouédraogo (born 1981), Belgian sprinter and hurdler
 Élodie Ramos (born 1983), French footballer
 Élodie Thomis (born 1986), French footballer
 Élodie Yung (born 1981), French film actress

Fictional characters 
 Élodie Blaise, female protagonist in Anatole France's 1912 historical novel, The Gods Are Athirst (Les Dieux ont Soif)
 Élodie Bradford, title character in French police series of the same name
 Princess Elodie, protagonist of the video game Long Live The Queen
 Élodie, leader of Franco-Iberia in the turn-based strategy game Civilization: Beyond Earth
Elodie Radcliffe, a minor character in the television series The Blacklist

See also 

 Eloise (name)

French feminine given names